"In the Dark" is a hit song written and performed by American rock singer and guitarist Billy Squier.

It appeared as the opening track of his Triple Platinum 1981 album Don't Say No, and was released as the second single from that album, following "The Stroke". It reached #35 in Billboard, #46 in Record World, and #41 in Cash Box magazine.  The pulsating track also hit #7 on Billboard Hot Mainstream Rock Tracks chart. It was the second of Squier's Top 40 hits in the 1980s.

Record World called it "mass appeal sharp edged rock featuring a blockbuster hook and savage guitar outbursts."

The Village Voice magazine ranked the song at #6 on their list 20 Best Arena Rock Songs of All Time.

Chart positions

References 

1981 singles
Billy Squier songs
Songs written by Billy Squier
Song recordings produced by Reinhold Mack
1981 songs
Capitol Records singles